Samuel Stinson Gannett (February 10, 1861 – August 5, 1939) was an American geographer, topographer, and cartographer. He was born on February 10, 1861, in Augusta, Maine, cousin of Henry Gannett. He attended Bowdoin College, and then MIT.

Work for US Geological Survey
In 1882 he moved to Washington, D.C. to work in the US Geological Survey, and in 1888 co-founded the National Geographic Society. His two most influential surveys were in the 20th century; the first in 1912 to determine Maryland's border with West Virginia, and the second in 1927 on the Red River to determine the border between Texas and Oklahoma. Both involved Supreme Court decisions. He died aged 77 in Sibley Hospital on August 5, 1939.

References

1861 births
1939 deaths
National Geographic Society founders
American geographers
People from Augusta, Maine
Bowdoin College alumni
Massachusetts Institute of Technology alumni
American surveyors